Horace Wilson (28 June 1864 – 15 May 1925) was an Australian cricketer. He played for Western Australia between 1892 and 1893.

References

External links

1864 births
1923 deaths
Australian cricketers
Cricketers from South Australia
Western Australia cricketers
Wicket-keepers